The 1998–99 NWHL season  was the first season of the National Women's Hockey League.

1998-99

Final standings
Note: GP = Games played, W = Wins, L = Losses, T = Ties, GF = Goals for, GA = Goals against, Pts = Points.

MVP of NWHL Western Division 

---Team: ----- Most Valuable Defense ---- Most Valuable Forward
Beatrice Aeros ----- Becky Kellar ---- Angela James
Brampton Thunder ---- Sue Merz ------- Jayna Hefford
Mississauga Chiefs --Nathalie Rivard ---Andria Hunter
Scarborough Sting -- Cassandra Turner --- Michelle Steele

Playoffs

First round

Eastern Division
April 10, 1999 - Montreal Jofa-Titan 3 at NCCP Raiders 1
April 11, 1999 - NCCP Raiders 4 at Montreal Jofa-Titan 4

Montreal Jofa-Titan wins 2 games semi-final 3 points to 1

April 10, 1999- Bonaventure Wingstar 4 at Laval Le Mistral 2
April 11, 1999- Laval Le Mistral 3 at Bonaventure Wingstar 8

Bonaventure Wingstar wins 2 game semi-final

Eastern Division Finals
April 17, 1999 - Bonaventure Wingstar 5 at Montreal Jofa-Titan 1
 April 18, 1999 - Montreal Jofa-Titan 2 at Bonaventure Wingstar 2

Bonaventure Wingstar wins in total goals.

Western Division
March 17, 1999 - Mississauga Chiefs 3 at Brampton Thunder 5
March 23, 1999- Brampton Thunder 2 at Mississauga Chiefs 1

Brampton Thunder wins best of 3 series 2-0.

Second round
April 23, 1999
18:15 hrs: Mississauga Chiefs 2  Bonaventure Wingstar 6
20:10 hrs: Montreal Jofa-Titan 2 @ Brampton Thunder 5

April 24, 1999
10:40 hrs: Montreal Jofa-Titan 2  Mississauga Chiefs 1
12:50 hrs: Brampton Thunder 6  Bonaventure Wingstar 2
17:50 hrs: Bonaventure Wingstar 4  Montreal Jofa-Titan 1
19:30 hrs: Brampton Thunder 2  Mississauga Chiefs 1

Final Round

April 25 
11:15 hrs: Bronze Medal Game
Mississauga Chiefs 2  Montreal Jofa-Titan 0
		

13:30 hres Gold Medal Game
Bonaventure Wingstar 2  Brampton Thunder 5
		

Gold Medal   : Brampton Thunder
Silver Medal : Bonaventure Wingstar
Bronze Medal : Mississauga Chiefs

Award and honour for playoffs
MVP Bonaventure Wingstar : Josee Cholette
MVP Mississauga Chiefs : Andria Hunter
MVP Montreal Jofa-Titan : Mai Lan Le

Scoring 20 leaders

1998-99 Eastern Division All-Star Team

First All-Star Team

Goalie
 Marie-France Morin, NCCP Raiders

Defense
Isabelle Chartrand, Laval Le Mistral
Isabelle Surprenant, Montreal Jofa-Titan

Forward
Annie Desrosiers, Laval Le Mistral
Nancy Drolet, Montreal Jofa-Titan
Caroline Ouellette, Bonaventure Wingstar

Second All-Star Team

Goalie (tie)
Vania Goeury, Laval Le Mistral
Marie-Claude Roy, Montreal Jofa-Titan

Defense
Anik Bouchard, Laval Le Mistral
Nancy Robitaille, Bonaventure Winstar

Forward
Dana Avery, NCCP Raiders
Mai-Lan Le, Montreal Jofa-Titan
Julie Pelletier, Laval Le Mistral

1998-99 Western Division All-Star Team

First All-Star Team

Goalie
Jen Dewar, Mississauga Chiefs

Defense
Nathalie Rivard, Mississauga Chiefs
Sue Merz, Brampton Thunder

Forward
Andria Hunter, Mississauga Chiefs
Angela James, Beatrice Aeros
Vicky Sunohara, Brampton Thunder

Second All-Star Team

Goalie
Kendra Fisher, Beatrice Aeros

Defense
Carol Cooper, Mississauga Chiefs
Gillian Ferrari, Beatrice Aero

Forward
Lori Dupuis, Brampton Thunder
Annie Fahlenbock, Mississauga Chiefs
Jayna Hefford, Brampton Thunder

See also
 National Women's Hockey League (1999–2007) (NWHL)

References

National Women's Hockey League (1999–2007) seasons
NWHL
NWHL